The Beautiful Image (French: La belle image) is a 1951 French drama film directed by Claude Heymann and starring Frank Villard, Françoise Christophe and Pierre Larquey. The film's sets were designed by the art director Robert Hubert. It was based on the 1941 novel of the same title by Marcel Aymé.

Synopsis
The face of a modest, quiet man unexpectedly changes one day into a handsome, vigorous one. He becomes a swaggering womaniser who none of his former acquaintances recognise. He even seduces his own wife in his new personae.

Cast
 Frank Villard as Raoul Cérusier / Roland Colbert  
 Françoise Christophe as Renée Cérusier  
 Pierre Larquey as L'oncle Antonin  
 Suzanne Flon as Lucienne Chenal  
 Robert Dalban as Julien Gauthier  
 Junie Astor as La Sarrazine  
 Olivier Hussenot as Le commissaire  
 Arlette Merry as La concierge  
 Gilberte Géniat as Annette, la bonne  
 Made Siamé as Mlle Lagorce  
 René Clermont as L'homme aux cochons d'Inde  
 Paul Faivre as L'employé du bureau B.C.B.  
 Ariane Murator as L'employée du bureau B.C.B. 
 Roland Armontel as Le pharmacien  
 Jacques Beauvais as Le maître d'hôtel  
 Paul Bisciglia 
 Louis Bugette as Le chauffeur de taxi  
 Claude Castaing 
 Jean-Jacques Duverger as Jacquot  
 Gilbert Edard 
 Lucien Guervil as L'inspecteur  
 Harry-Max 
 Gilbert Sauval as Le clochard  
 Titys as Un employé

References

Bibliography 
 Frey, Hugo. Louis Malle. Manchester University Press, 2004.

External links 
 

1951 films
1951 drama films
French drama films
1950s French-language films
Films based on French novels
Films based on works by Marcel Aymé
Films directed by Claude Heymann
French black-and-white films
 Gaumont Film Company films
1950s French films